Tecoanapa   is one of the 81 municipalities of Guerrero, in south-western Mexico. The municipal seat lies at Tecoanapa.

In 2005, the municipality had a population of 42,619.

Gallery

References

Municipalities of Guerrero